The Harushio class is a diesel-electric submarine class operated by the Japanese Maritime Self-Defense Force (JMSDF). The design is an evolution from the  being slightly larger and with better noise reduction. Asashio, has been modified to test air-independent propulsion (AIP), and the remaining vessels were decommissioned and replaced by the Oyashio-class.

Natsushio, Hayashio, Arashio and Asashio are all named after World War II destroyers.

Vessels

See also
 Hai Lung-class submarine
 Walrus-class submarine
 Dolphin-class submarine
 Type 039 submarine
 Upholder/Victoria-class submarine
 Collins-class submarine
 Lada-class submarine
 S-80-class submarine

References
 Jane's Fighting Ships 2005–2006

Submarine classes
 
 
Harushio class
Auxiliary training ship classes